Kallistatin is a protein that in humans is encoded by the SERPINA4 gene.

Kallistatin consists of three folded ß segments and eight helical structures and contains two functional domains, an active site and a heparin-binding site. 

Kallistatin signals through several receptors, including integrin ß3, lipoprotein receptor-related protein 6 ( LRP6 ), nucleolin, and Krüppel-like factor 4 ( KLF4 ).

See also
 Serpin

References

Further reading

External links
 The MEROPS online database for peptidases and their inhibitors: I04.003
 

Serine protease inhibitors